Chaffey Titans Rugby League Football Club is an Australian rugby league football club based in Mildura, Victoria. They conduct teams for junior, senior and women tag teams.

They won their inaugural premiership in 2012 defeating Sunraysia Rabbitohs 34-26.
The following year 2013, they won their second premiership against Mildura Tigers narrowly winning 22-20.

See also

Rugby league in Victoria
Worst Team In SRL.

References

External links
Chaffey Titans RLFC at SportsTG

Rugby league teams in Victoria (Australia)
Rugby clubs established in 2012
2012 establishments in Australia
Sport in Mildura